The Gangkou Suspension Bridge is a pedestrian suspension bridge in Manzhou Township, Pingtung County in Taiwan. It crosses the Gangkou River.

Architecture
The bridge is painted in red and white color. It can accommodate a maximum of 60 people crossing at one time.

See also
 Transportation in Taiwan

References

Bridges in Pingtung County
Suspension bridges in Taiwan